Gerardo Jimenez Espina Jr. (born August 7, 1970), also known as Gerry Espina, is a Filipino politician. He is currently the Representative of the lone District of Biliran, having been elected in the 2010 elections. Prior to this, he was a member of the 13th Congress of the Philippines as representative of the lone legislative district of Biliran which he served for one term from 2004-2007.

Biography and career 
Gerardo Jimenez Espina Jr. was born on August 7, 1970 in Manila, the son of a former congressman and mayor, Gerardo Sabinay Espina Sr. He finished both his elementary and secondary education at the San Beda College. He finished Bachelor in Marketing at the Philippine School of Business Administration in, Quezon City in 1992.

Political career
He started his political career as a municipal mayor of the municipality of Naval, Biliran in 1998 and served until 2004. From 2004 up to 2007, he was a member of the House of Representatives as representative of the lone district of Biliran. In the May 10, 2010 elections, he became a Governor of the Province of Biliran, Philippines.

He is also a member of one of the longest serving Political Dynasties in Biliran dating back in the 70's. His father was a delegate of the 1972 Constitutional Convention, three term member of the House of Representatives and Mayor of Naval, Biliran. His brothers Rogelio, former governor, now congressman of the same district and Rodolfo, Mayor of Kawayan, Biliran, and sister Roselyn, one-time councilor of Naval. He is uncle to singer entertainer Gretchen Espina.

Committee Membership
As a member of House of Representatives, Espina was the Vice Chairman of the House Committee on Agriculture, Food and Fisheries and of the House Committee on Youth and Sports Development. Congressman Espina also had memberships in the following house committees: Accounts; Basic Education and Culture; Energy; Foreign Affairs; Games and Amusement; Higher and Technical Education; Legislative Franchises; Local Government; National Defense and Security; Natural Resources; People's Participation; Public Order and Security; Tourism; and Ways and Means.

References 

Personal Information
Political Information
Relatives

|-

|-

|-

|-

|-

1970 births
Living people
People from Biliran
Governors of Biliran
Members of the House of Representatives of the Philippines from Biliran
Mayors of places in Biliran